Raúl Calvo (8 May 1917 – 9 September 1996) was an Argentine basketball player who competed in the 1948 Summer Olympics when they finished 15th.

References

1917 births
1996 deaths
Argentine men's basketball players
Olympic basketball players of Argentina
Basketball players at the 1948 Summer Olympics